The following is a list of notable people associated with the Ceylon University College (also known as University College, Ceylon; University College, Colombo; and Colombo University College) (1921–42).

Presidents
 1921–25 William Manning
 1925–27 Hugh Clifford
 1928–31 Herbert Stanley
 1931–33 Graeme Thomson
 1933–37 Reginald Edward Stubbs
 1937–42 Andrew Caldecott

Principals
 1921 Edwin Evans
 1921–40 Robert Marrs
 1940–42 Ivor Jennings

Academics

 Nigel Ball – professor of botany
 David Raitt Robertson Burt - lecturer in zoology, 1924–39; professor of zoology, 1939-42
 K. Kanapathypillai – lecturer in Tamil
 E. F. C. Ludowyk – professor of English
 A. W. Mailvaganam – lecturer in physics
 Gunapala Piyasena Malalasekera – lecturer in Sanskrit, Pali and Sinhala
 W. S. Senior – lecturer in classics
 C. Suntharalingam – chair of mathematics

Alumni

Academia
 V. Appapillai – lecturer in physics, dean of the Faculty of Science at the University of Ceylon, Peradeniya
 K. S. Arulnandhy – lecturer in education
 J. T. Arulanantham – Principal of St. John's College, Jaffna
 A. M. A. Azeez – Principal of Zahira College, Colombo
 C. J. Eliezer – professor of mathematics
 H. A. I. Goonetileke – assistant librarian
 Don Carlin Gunawardena –  professor of Botany; Head of the Department of Science at Vidyodaya University, Ceylon 
 K. Kanapathypillai – professor of Tamil; head of the Department of Tamil at the University of Ceylon
 E. F. C. Ludowyk – professor of English
 A. W. Mailvaganam – professor of physics; dean of the Faculty of Science at the University of Ceylon
 T. Nadaraja – professor of law; chancellor of the University of Jaffna
 E. O. E. Pereira – professor of civil engineering; vice-chancellor of the University of Ceylon
 Ediriweera Sarachchandra – lecturer in Pali
 V. Veerasingam – Principal of Manipay Hindu College; Member of Parliament for Vaddukoddai

Arts
 Regi Siriwardena – writer

Civil service
 K. Alvapillai – permanent secretary
 C. Balasingham – permanent secretary at the Ministry of Health
 C.A. Coorey – permanent secretary at the Ministry Finance and Treasury
 H.C. Goonewardene – permanent secretary at the Ministry of Home Affairs
Bogoda Premaratne - educator, civil servant
 M. Rajendra – permanent secretary, government agent
 M. Srikantha – permanent secretary, government agent
 S. J. Walpita – permanent secretary at the Ministry of Industries and Fisheries; vice-chancellor of the University of Ceylon, Peradeniya

Government and politics

 Hector Abhayavardhana – politician
 A. Amirthalingam – Leader of the Opposition
 M. Balasundaram – Member of Parliament for Kopay
 Colvin R. de Silva – government minister
 C. P. de Silva – government minister
 Walwin de Silva – Member of Parliament for Ambalangoda–Balapitiya; vice-chancellor of the University of Ceylon, Colombo
 William de Silva – government minister
 Doric de Souza – Senator; associated professor of English; permanent secretary at the Ministry of Plantation Industries and Constitutional Affairs
 J. R. Jayewardene – President
 P. Kandiah – Member of Parliament for Point Pedro
 V. A. Kandiah – Member of Parliament for Kayts
 Anil Moonesinghe – government minister
 K. V. Nadarajah – Member of Parliament for Bandarawela
 N. M. Perera – government minister
 N. R. Rajavarothiam – Member of Parliament for Trincomalee
 T. Ramalingam – Member of Parliament for Point Pedro
 E. L. Senanayake – Speaker of the Parliament
 M. Sivasithamparam – Deputy Speaker
 M. Tiruchelvam – government minister
 C. Vanniasingam – Member of Parliament for Kopay

Law
 Oswald Leslie De Kretser III – Supreme Court judge
 T. B. Dissanayake – lawyer
 S. R. Kanaganayagam – lawyer, senator
 S. Nadesan – lawyer, senator
 K. Palakidnar – President of the Court of Appeal
 Bernard Peiris – lawyer, cabinet secretary
 P. Sriskandarajah – Supreme Court judge
 H. W. Thambiah – Supreme Court judge
 Victor Tennekoon – Chief Justice
 Vincent Thamotheram – Supreme Court judge

Military
 Anton Muttukumaru – Commander of the Army

Religion

 Cyril Abeynaike – Anglican Bishop of Colombo
 Thomas Cooray – Roman Catholic Archbishop of Colombo
 Bastiampillai Deogupillai – Roman Catholic Bishop of Jaffna
 Narada Maha Thera – Superior of Vajirarama Temple

Other
 S. C. C. Anthony Pillai – trade unionist and Member of Parliament.
 S. Arumugam – irrigation engineer
 Sydney de Zoysa – Deputy Inspector General of Police, permanent secretary at the Ministry of Internal Security
 B. D. Rampala – general manager of Sri Lanka Railways
 L. H. Sumanadasa – engineer, vice-chancellor of the University of Sri Lanka
 C. J. T. Thamotheram – teacher, publisher and social worker.

Notes

References

 
 

Ceylon University College
 
People from British Ceylon